DCSMAT Business School is a business school located in Vagamon, Idukki, Kerala, India. The institution is approved by All India Council for Technical Education (AICTE) for both Master of Business Administration courses and two-year MBA programs.

See also 
 DC School of Management and Technology

References

External links 
 

Business schools in Kerala
Schools in Idukki district